The 1989 CONCACAF Championship was the tenth and final edition of the CONCACAF Championship held under the format of serving as qualification to the 1990 FIFA World Cup and having no host nation for the final round. The tournament would be succeeded by the CONCACAF Gold Cup in 1991.

Costa Rica narrowly emerged as champions on goal difference to win their third title and participate in their first World Cup. The United States finished runners-up by virtue of one goal and qualified for their first World Cup in forty years. The U.S. gained their first World Cup qualification in 40 years by beating Trinidad and Tobago in their last game by 1–0, with a goal dubbed "The Shot Heard around the World".

A total of sixteen CONCACAF teams entered the competition. However, FIFA rejected the entry of Belize due to debts to FIFA.

Qualification

Five teams qualified from the two stage qualification process that ran from April to November 1988. Mexico were disqualified during this stage after having been found to have fielded over-aged players during the 1988 CONCACAF U-20 Tournament. Their scheduled opponents Costa Rica therefore advanced to the Final Round unopposed.

Final round

Costa Rica won the 1989 CONCACAF Championship and, along with the United States, qualified for the 1990 FIFA World Cup.

Goalscorers

2 goals

 Evaristo Coronado
 Juan Arnoldo Cayasso
 Leónidas Flores
 Raúl Chacón
 Julio Rodas
 Leonson Lewis
 Kerry Jamerson
 Philibert Jones

1 goal

 Carlos Hidalgo
 Gilberto Rhoden
 Pastor Fernández
 Roger Flores
 Jaime Rodríguez
 José María Rivas
 Hutson Charles
 Bruce Murray
 Eric Eichmann
 Hugo Perez
 Paul Caligiuri
 Steve Trittschuh
 Tab Ramos

References

External links
 North, Central American and Caribbean zone at FIFA.com

 
1989
CONCACAF
1989
Championship
1989 in American soccer
1989 in Trinidad and Tobago football